Andreoni is an Italian and Corsican surname, derived from the given name Andrea. Notable people with the surname include:

 Cristian Andreoni (born 1992), Italian football player
 Giovanni Battista Andreoni (1720-1797), Italian castrato singer
 James Andreoni (born 1959), American economist
 Luis Andreoni (1853-1936), Italian engineer active in Uruguay
 Serge Andreoni (born 1940), French politician

Italian-language surnames
Patronymic surnames
Surnames from given names